This is a list of Kosovan football transfers for the summer sale prior to the 2021–22 season. Only moves from Football Superleague of Kosovo are listed.

Transfers

All clubs without a flag are Kosovan.
Flags indicate national team as defined under FIFA eligibility rules. Players may hold more than one non-FIFA nationality.Where a player has not declared an international allegiance, nation is determined by place of birth.

Ballkani

In

Out

Drenica

In

Out

Drita

In

Out

Dukagjini

In

Out

Feronikeli

In

Out

Gjilani

In

Out

Llapi

In

Out

Malisheva

In

Out

Prishtina

In

Out

Ulpiana

In

Out

References

Kosovo
Summer